Lake Bermin (sometimes spelled Bemin or Beme) is a small lake in the volcanic chain in the Southwest Region of Cameroon. This highly isolated lake is roughly circular in shape, lacks an inflow, but has an outflow into the Cross River system.

Biology
Despite its very small size, it supports nine endemic species of coptodonine cichlid fishes (C. bakossiorum, C. bemini, C. bythobates, C. flava, C. gutturosa, C. imbriferna, C. snyderae, C. spongotroktis, and C. thysi). This number of endemic fishes per area is the highest recorded anywhere. Early genetic evidence suggested that these probably were the result of sympatric speciation. Later studies indicate a level of secondary gene flow between the Bermin cichlids and Cross River C. guineensis, although it is unclear if this facilitated speciation among the former group. They are a relatively recent radiation. They are quite similar in their general appearance and morphology but vary greatly in feeding behavior, including specialists like C. spongotroktis that eat pieces of the large sponges that grow in the lake. The Lake Bermin cichlids are small fish, none surpassing  in standard length.

All the Bermin cichlids are critically endangered by pollution and sedimentation from human activities, and potentially also by large emissions of carbon dioxide (CO2) from the lake's bottom (compare Lake Nyos), although Bermin is too shallow to contain very high amounts of this gas.

See also
 Lake Barombi Koto
 Lake Barombi Mbo
 Lake Dissoni
 Lake Ejagham
 Lake Oku

References

Volcanic crater lakes
Lakes of Cameroon
Southwest Region (Cameroon)